Touhami Ghezzoul (born 5 January 1987) is an Algerian basketball player who plays for  Al-Karamah of the Syrian Basketball League. He also played for the GS Pétroliers

Professional career
Ghezzoul started his career with Al Nasr. In 2011, he signed with GS Pétroliers where he has played ever since.

On May 6, 2022, Ghezzoul signed with Al-Karamah of the Syrian Basketball League (SBL) ahead of its Final Four stage.

Honours

Club
GS Pétroliers
Super Division: 2012, 2014, 2015, 2016, 2017, 2018, 2019.
Algerian Basketball Cup: 2012, 2013, 2014, 2015, 2016.

Algeria
2022 Arab Basketball Championship:  Bronze medal

BAL career statistics

|-
| style="text-align:left;"|2021
| style="text-align:left;"|GS Pétroliers
| 3 || 2 || 17.2 || .550 || - || .500 || 6.3 || .0 || .3 || .7 || 8.7
|-
|- class="sortbottom"
| style="text-align:center;" colspan="2"|Career
| 3 || 2 || 17.2 || .550 || - || .500 || 6.3 || .0 || .3 || .7 || 8.7

References

External links
 Profile basketball.afrobasket

1987 births
Living people
Algerian men's basketball players
People from Ouargla
Centers (basketball)
Algerian expatriate basketball people in Oman
Algerian expatriate basketball people in Saudi Arabia
GS Pétroliers basketball players
21st-century Algerian people